Ordinary Person is a 2017 South Korean crime-action drama film directed by Kim Bong-han, starring Son Hyun-joo and Jang Hyuk. It was released on 23 March 2017.

Synopsis
In the spring of 1987, Kang Sung-jin (Son Hyun-joo) was an upright police officer with a wife (Ra Mi-ran) and a son. Their only wish was to lead a simple life and they worked hard towards their dream of owning a two-storey house. One day Sung-jin got involved in a conspiracy led by National Security Planning chief, Choi Gyu-nam (Jang Hyuk) after he arrested a suspected murderer (Jo Dal-hwan) by chance. Gyu-nam, being a cold-blooded and manipulative man, made use of Sung-jin's weakness to strike a deal with him. Despite newspaper reporter Chu Jae-jin (Kim Sang-ho)'s advice to quit from the operation, Sung-jin discovered that he did not have a choice as he had already scheduled an operation to treat his son's legs.

Cast

Son Hyun-joo as Kang Sung-jin, policeman 
Jang Hyuk as Choi Gyu-nam, National Security Planning chief 
Kim Sang-ho as Chu Jae-jin, reporter
Ra Mi-ran as Song Jeong-sook, Sung-jin's wife (special appearance)
Ji Seung-hyun as Park Dong-gyu
Jung Man-sik as Shin Yong-soo (special appearance)
Jo Dal-hwan as Kim Tae-sang
Oh Yeon-ah as Park Sun-hee
Park Hyung-soo as Agent
Choi Yoon-so as Ji-sook
Park Ji-il
Han Ha-na
Lee Ja-eun
Joo Kwang-hyun

Awards and nominations

References

External links 
Ordinary Person at Naver Movies 
 

2017 films
2017 crime action films
2017 action drama films
2017 crime drama films
South Korean action drama films
South Korean crime drama films
South Korean crime action films
Films set in 1987
2010s South Korean films